Sirivanh Ketavong (born September 1, 1970) is a Laotian athlete.

Described as "the best female distance runner in Laos", one of the world's poorest countries with few training facilities, Ketavong competed in the marathon at the 1996 Summer Olympics in Atlanta and at the 2000 Summer Olympics in Sydney. She completed the race on both occasions, but finished last but one in Atlanta, with a time of 3:25:16, and last in Sydney, with a time of 3:34:27. Ketavong completed the Sydney marathon "to a standing ovation from some fans".

International competitions

See also
 Laos at the 1996 Summer Olympics
 Laos at the 2000 Summer Olympics

References
sports-reference

External links
 

1970 births
Laotian female long-distance runners
Athletes (track and field) at the 1996 Summer Olympics
Athletes (track and field) at the 1998 Asian Games
Athletes (track and field) at the 2000 Summer Olympics
Olympic athletes of Laos
Living people
Female marathon runners
Asian Games competitors for Laos